Germain Toupet Kouadio (born 27 December 1992) is an Ivorian professional footballer who plays as a Left Winger for Togolese Championnat National club ASKO Kara.

Club career

Travnik
In February 2016, Kouadio signed for Bosnian club Travnik. After just five months he left the club.

Zrinjski Mostar
In July 2016, Kouadio signed for another Bosnian club Zrinjski Mostar. In February 2017, Kouadio left the club.

České Budějovice
One month after he left the Bosnia and Herzegovina, Kouadio signed for Czech club České Budějovice. Kouadio left the club in August.

Čelik Zenica
In August 2017, Kouadio went back to Bosnia and Herzegovina and signes a contract with Čelik Zenica. Kouadio left the club after one season.

ASKO Kara
After three years without club, Kouadio signed for Togolese club ASKO Kara.

Career statistics

Club

References

1992 births
Living people
Ivorian footballers
Association football forwards
FK Sarajevo players
HŠK Zrinjski Mostar players
Premier League of Bosnia and Herzegovina players